Carlos Orellana (born 1907, date of death unknown) was a Mexican boxer. He competed in the men's lightweight event at the 1928 Summer Olympics. At the 1928 Summer Olympics, he lost to Cecil Bissett of Rhodesia.

References

1907 births
Year of death missing
Mexican male boxers
Olympic boxers of Mexico
Boxers at the 1928 Summer Olympics
Boxers from Mexico City
Lightweight boxers